Raymond "Ray" Hayes (February 25, 1935 – February 17, 1987) was an American football fullback who played for one season for the Minnesota Vikings of the National Football League. He played college football at the University of Maryland Eastern Shore and the University of Central Oklahoma.

References

1935 births
1987 deaths
American football fullbacks
Central Oklahoma Bronchos football players
Maryland Eastern Shore Hawks football players
Minnesota Vikings players
Players of American football from Oklahoma
People from Osage County, Oklahoma